The Universal College Islamabad (UCI), formerly known as University College of Islamabad, is a higher education university based in Sector F-8/2 in Islamabad, Pakistan.

Universal College Islamabad was founded in 1992 by Dr. Alan Bicker with the support of prominent Pakistani scientists who noticed a dearth of quality higher education. UCI is a pioneer in offering the University of London International Programmes (EMFSS and Law) in Pakistan. Dr. Maria Catalina Alliende is the Principal of the College.

UCI offers University of London LLB, Higher National Diploma (HND), Association of Chartered Certified Accountants (CA), Chartered Institute of Management Accountants (CIMA), ACCA the UK and others. All the University of London International Programmes are recognized by the Higher Education Commission of Pakistan.

UCI collaborated in 2021 with Monroe College, New York City, USA and introduced the first bilateral American MBA program in Pakistan.

Notable alumni 
 Ali Rehman Khan  
 Ali Muhammad Khan  
 Uzair Jaswal
 Hira Pervaiz 
 Zara Qaiser
 Khadija Khan 
 Tehmina Shaukat 
 Komal Shakeel 
 Anas Ali Rao 
 Barrister Syed Qamar Sabzwari
 Barrister Faisal Khan Toru
 Barrister Mumtaz Ali
 Barrister Sajeel Swati

Notable faculty members 
 Dr. Maria Catalina Alliende
 Mazhar Loan
 Ghazala Minallah
 Barrister Syed Qamar Sabzwari
 Barrister Faisal Khan Toru
 Barrister Mumtaz Ali
 Barrister Sajeel Swati
 Rabia Saeed
 Dr. Muhammad Munir
 Dr. Sajid Manzoor
 Waseem Mustafa
 Dr. Aqueel ur Rehman

References

External links 
 

Universities and colleges in Islamabad